Tempest Fantasy is a 2003 chamber music composition in five movements for cello, clarinet, violin, and piano by the American composer Paul Moravec.  The piece is dedicated to clarinetist David Krakauer and the piano trio Trio Solisti, who premiered the work May 2, 2003 at Morgan Library & Museum in New York City.  The title of the work comes from the play The Tempest by William Shakespeare.  The work won the 2004 Pulitzer Prize for Music.

Composition

Structure
Tempest Fantasy has a duration of approximately thirty minutes and is composed in five movements:
Ariel
Prospero
Caliban
Sweet Airs
Fantasia

Style and inspiration
Moravec commented on the composition in the program notes for the work, saying:
Moravec has also suggested that the piece was an allegory for his own struggle with depression, commenting: "Coming back from depression, I identified with Prospero and his melancholy and his downcast state. Through the power of imagination he improves his condition, and so that’s what I did as a composer."

See also
List of compositions by Paul Moravec

References

Compositions by Paul Moravec
2003 compositions
Pulitzer Prize for Music-winning works
Chamber music compositions
21st-century classical music
Music based on works by William Shakespeare
Works based on The Tempest